Rendang is a Minang dish originating from the Minangkabau region in West Sumatra, Indonesia. It has spread across Indonesian cuisine to the cuisines of neighbouring Southeast Asian countries such as Malaysia, Singapore, Brunei and the Philippines. Rendang is often described as a rich dish of meat — most commonly beef (rendang daging) — that has been slow cooked and braised in a coconut milk seasoned with a herb and spice mixture, until the liquids evaporate and the meat turns dark brown and tender, becoming caramelized and infused with rich flavours.

As the signature dish of Minangkabau culture, rendang is traditionally served at ceremonial occasions to honour guests during festive events; such as wedding feasts and Lebaran or Hari Raya (Indonesian popular words for both Eid al-Fitr and Eid al-Adha). Rendang is also traditionally served among the Malay community in Indonesia, Malaysia, Singapore and Brunei, as well as the Maranao in the Philippines.

Rendang is officially recognised as one of Indonesia's national dishes. Six types of rendang preparations have also been designated as intangible cultural heritage by the Indonesian Ministry of Education and Culture. A broad survey in 2011 placed beef rendang as the most delicious dish in the world.

History

The origin of rendang could be traced back to the Indian merchants links to West Sumatra before the 15th century. There are Dutch archives about Minangkabau that state regular contacts between India and West Sumatra in the early second millennium, thus suggests that north Indian curry was possibly the precursor of rendang. Indian curry was adopted by the Minangkabau people as gulai, a local version of curry. Minangkabau people then cooked this gulai further in order to prepare kalio also known as wet rendang. This cooking process was then continued until it thickened and became rendang or also known as dry rendang.

Andalas University historian, Prof. Gusti Asnan suggests that rendang began to spread across the region when Minangkabau merchants began to trade and migrate to Malacca in the 16th century, "Because the journey through the river waterways in Sumatra took much time, a durable preserved dry rendang is suitable for a long journey." The dried Padang rendang is a durable food, good to consume for weeks, even when left at room temperature. One of the earliest written records of rendang is from the Malaccan Malay manuscript of Hikayat Amir Hamzah, 
Rendang originated in the Sumatran Minangkabau region and the making of rendang spreads from Minangkabau highlands to Mandailing, Riau, Jambi, across the strait to Malacca and Negeri Sembilan, resulting in a variety of rendang traditions.

During Indonesian National Revolution in 1946, Indonesian first lady Fatmawati, the wife of Sukarno cooked and sent rendang to boost morale of Indonesian republic freedom fighters around Yogyakarta. Declined by household helps, she insisted on buying beef and went to the market herself by becak despite being pregnant at that time.

The popularity of rendang has spread widely from its original domain because of the merantau (migrating) culture of Minangkabau people. In the modern era, Overseas Minangkabau leave their hometown to start a career in other Indonesian cities as well as neighboring countries, and Padang restaurants, Minangkabau eating establishments that are ubiquitous in Indonesian cities, spring up. These Padang restaurants have introduced and popularised Minangkabau style rendang and other Padang food dishes across Indonesia, Malaysia, Singapore, and the wider world.

Cultural significance

Rendang is revered in Minangkabau culture as an embodiment of the philosophy of musyawarah, discussion and consultation with elders. It has been claimed that the four main ingredients represent Minangkabau society as a whole:
 The meat (daging) symbolises the Niniak Mamak, the traditional clan leaders such as the datuk, the nobles, royalty and revered elders.
 The coconut milk (karambia) symbolises the Cadiak Pandai, intellectuals, teachers, poets and writers.
 The chilli (lado) symbolises the Alim Ulama, clerics, ulama and religious leaders. The hotness of the chilli symbolises Sharia.
 The spice mixture (pemasak) symbolises the rest of Minangkabau society.
In Minangkabau tradition, rendang is a requisite dish for special occasions in traditional Minang ceremonies, from birth ceremonies to circumcision, marriage, Qur'an recitals, and religious festivals such as Eid al-Fitr and Eid al-Adha.

In 2011, rendang placed 11th place on a list of World's 50 best foods published by CNN International. An online reader's poll of 35,000 voters chose beef rendang as the top dish on CNN International's Readers' picks list.

The Indonesian Ministry of Education and Culture have included six rendang preparations under its National Intangible Cultural Heritage of Indonesia list, all of which are registered under West Sumatra: Randang (Minang spelling), and gulai rendang, were part of the inaugural list in 2010. They were joined by randang daging (meat rendang), randang kantang (potato rendang), and randang incek kacang, in 2016. Rendang paku (fern rendang) of Dharmasraya, is the most recent addition as of 2018.

In 2018, rendang was officially recognised by the Indonesian government as one of the country's five national dishes: the others are soto, sate, nasi goreng, and gado-gado.

Composition and cooking method

Rendang is most often described as meat slow-cooked in coconut milk and spices until it becomes tender. If cooked properly, dry rendang can last for as long as four weeks. Prior to refrigeration technology, this style of cooking enabled preservation of the large amount of meat. The cooking technique flourished because of its role in preserving meat in a tropical climate. Its durability is one of the reasons that today, prepackaged rendang is sent as food aid relief for natural disaster survivors in Indonesia. The cut of beef suitable for rendang is lean meat of the rear leg of the cattle; i.e. topside or round beef, which is considered perfect for slow cooking.

Rendang is rich in spices. Along with the main meat ingredient, rendang uses coconut milk and a paste of mixed ground spices, including ginger, galangal, turmeric leaves, lemongrass, garlic, shallots, chillis and other spices. This spice mixture is called pemasak in Minangkabau. The spices, garlic, shallot, ginger and galangal used in rendang have antimicrobial properties and serve as natural organic preservatives. Although some culinary experts describe rendang as a curry, the dish is usually not considered as such in Indonesia or Malaysia since it is richer and contains less liquid than is normal for curries.

Traditionally the term rendang does not refer to a certain type of dish. The verb merendang actually refers to a method of slow cooking; continuously churning the ingredients in a pot or frying pan, on a small fire, until all of the liquids evaporate and the meat is well done. Traditional Padang rendang takes hours to cook. Cooking rendang involves pounding and grinding ingredients as well as slow cooking, and so is time-consuming and requires patience. The meat pieces are slowly cooked in coconut milk and spices until almost all the liquid is gone, allowing the meat to become tender and absorb the condiments. The cooking process changes from boiling to frying, as the liquid evaporates and the coconut milk turns to coconut oil. Cooking the meat until tender with almost all the liquid evaporated requires great care, keeping it from getting burnt. Because of its generous use of numerous spices, rendang is known for having a complex and unique taste.

Rendang is often served with steamed rice, ketupat (a compressed rice cake) or lemang (glutinous rice cooked in bamboo tubes), accompanied with vegetable side dishes such as boiled cassava leaf, cubadak (young jackfruit gulai), cabbage gulai and lado (red or green chilli pepper sambal).

Types

In Minangkabau culinary tradition, there are three recognised stages in cooking meat in spicy coconut milk. The dish which results is categorised according to the liquid content of the cooked coconut milk, which ranges from the most wet and soupy to the most dry: Gulai — Kalio – Rendang. The ingredients of gulai, kalio and rendang are almost identical with the exceptions that gulai usually has less red chilli pepper and more turmeric, while rendang has richer spices.

If pieces of meat are cooked in spicy coconut milk and the process stopped right when the meat is done and the coconut milk has reached its boiling point, the dish is called gulai. If the process continues until the coconut milk is partly evaporated and the meat has started to brown, the dish is called kalio. For traditional dry rendang, the process continues hours beyond this, until the liquid has all but completely evaporated and the color turns to a dark brown, almost black color. Thus not only liquid content but also color indicate which type of rendang is involved: gulai is light yellow, kalio is brown and rendang is very dark brown. Today, one mostly finds only two simpler categories of rendang: either dry or wet.

Dry rendang

According to Minangkabau tradition, their true rendang is the dry one. Although, unlike crispy dendeng balado spicy jerky, rendang's texture is not actually dry, since it is quite moist and rather oily. Rendang is diligently stirred, attended, and cooked for hours until the coconut milk has evaporated, turned into coconut oil, and the meat has absorbed the spices. It is still served for special ceremonial occasions or to honor guests. If cooked properly, dried rendang can last for three to four weeks stored at room temperature and is still good to consume. It can even last months stored in a refrigerator, and up to six months if frozen.

Wet rendang or kalio

Wet rendang, more accurately identified as kalio, is a type of rendang that is cooked for a shorter period of time and much of the coconut milk liquid has not evaporated. Kalio has quite abundant liquid sauce acquired from cooked coconut milk that partly has turned into spicy oil, which is quite flavourful if consumed with steamed rice. Much of rendang served abroad is actually more akin to kalio or wet version of rendang. If stored at room temperature, kalio lasts less than a week. Kalio usually has a light golden brown colour, paler than dry rendang.

Variations

Rendang is made from beef (or occasionally beef liver, chicken, duck, mutton, water buffalo, or vegetables like jackfruit or cassava). Chicken or duck rendang also contains tamarind and is usually not cooked for as long as beef rendang.

The original Minangkabau rendang has two categories, rendang darek and rendang pesisir. Rendang darek (‘land rendang’) is an umbrella term for dishes from old regions in mountainous areas of the Minangkabau Highlands such as Batusangkar, Agam, Lima Puluh Kota, Payakumbuh, Padang Panjang and Bukittinggi. It mainly consists of beef, offal, poultry products, jackfruit, and many other vegetables and animal products which are found in these places. Rendang pesisir (‘coastal rendang’) is from the coastal regions of Minangkabau such as Pariaman, Padang, Painan and Pasaman. Rendang pesisir mainly consists of seafood, although it is not unusual for them to incorporate beef or water buffalo meat in their rendang.

Indonesian Rendang variations:
 Rendang ayam: chicken rendang, speciality of Batusangkar and Bukittinggi.
 Rendang ati ampela: rendang made of chicken innards; liver and gizzard.
 Rendang babat: tripe rendang, made of tripes of cattle.
 Rendang babi: pork rendang, the adaptation of rendang by non-Muslim population of Indonesia that replace beef with pork. Usually consumed in Christian-majority Batak region of North Sumatra and Hindu-majority island of Bali. In Bali, the popularity of rendang has led to this adaptation, since some Balinese Hindus do not consume beef.
 Rendang baluik (rendang belut): eel rendang, speciality of Solok. In the Solok dialect, it is also called ‘randang baluk’.
 Rendang bilih (bilis): bilis fish rendang, specialty of Padang Panjang. In Sumatra ikan bilis refers distinctly to Mystacoleucus padangensis, a small freshwater fish endemic to Sumatra. In other places bilis might refer to sea anchovy instead.
 Rendang cubadak (rendang nangka): unripe jackfruit rendang, speciality of Payakumbuh.
 Rendang cumi: squid rendang, a seafood variant of rendang usually consumed in coastal area.
 Rendang daging: meat rendang. The most common rendang is made from beef, but may also be from water buffalo, goat, mutton or lamb, speciality of Padang.
 Rendang datuk (rendang kering): dried beef rendang, that instead of using fresh beef cuts, the pieces of meat are dried for four days prior of cooking. Specialty of Muara Enim in South Sumatra.
 Rendang daun kayu (samba buruk): rendang made of various edible leaves, usually leaves of ubi kayu, jirak, mali, rambai, daun arbai, mixed with ikan haruan (snakehead fish), specialty of Payakumbuh.
 Rendang daun pepaya: young papaya leaf rendang.
 Rendang dendeng: Dendeng rendang, thinly sliced dried and fried beef cooked in rendang spice. Also can be made from readily available processed beef jerky.
 Rendang gabus (rendang ikan haruan): Snakehead fish rendang, popular in Payakumbuh.
 Rendang gadih, rendang tumbuk or rendang payakumbuh: Minced beef rendang, tumbuk or pounded beef shaped into balls mixed with coconut, specialty of Payakumbuh, West Sumatra.
 Rendang hati: cow liver rendang, speciality of Minangkabau.
 Rendang ikan asap (rendang ikan salai): smoked fish rendang, usually made of smoked ikan pari or ray fish, specialty of Minangkabau.
 Rendang itiak (rendang bebek): duck rendang, speciality of Bukittinggi and Payakumbuh.
 Rendang jamur: mushroom rendang.
 Rendang jantung pisang: banana blossom rendang, speciality of Minangkabau.
 Rendang jawa: Javanese adoption of Minang rendang, which is more soft and moist suited to Javanese taste, usually rather sweet and less spicy compared to Sumatran rendang.
 Rendang jariang (rendang jengkol): jengkol rendang, commonly popular in West Sumatran towns, especially Bukittinggi, Payakumbuh, Pasaman and Lubuk Basung.
 Rendang kambing: goat meat redang.
 Rendang jo kantang: beef rendang with baby potatoes, speciality of Kapau.
 Rendang kelinci: rabbit meat rendang, popular in Aceh.
 Rendang kepiting (rendang ketam): crab rendang, which is crab cooked in rendang spices with sweet soy sauce.
 Rendang lele: Catfish rendang.
 Rendang lidah: beef tongue cooked as rendang.
 Rendang limpa: offal rendang made of cattle spleen.
 Rendang lokan (rendang tiram): marsh clam rendang, speciality of coastal Minangkabau regions such as Pariaman, Painan and Pesisir Selatan.
 Rendang maco: rendang that uses a type of salted fish, specialty of Limapuluh Koto.
 Rendang medan: rendang variant from Medan in North Sumatra, slightly different to Minangkabau rendang. It is more fatty and wet akin to kalio and usually less hot and spicy.
 Rendang padang: Padang rendang commonly sold in Padang restaurants nationwide, dry rendang that uses lean fatless meat.
 Rendang pakis (rendang pucuk paku): vegetable rendang made from pakis or fern leaf, specialty of Pasaman.
 Rendang paru: cow's lung rendang, speciality of Payakumbuh.
 Rendang patin: Pangasius catfish rendang.
 Rendang petai: stir fried petai and common green beans in rendang spices.
 Rendang pucuak ubi (rendang daun singkong): cassava leaf rendang, speciality of Minangkabau.
 Rendang punai (rendang burung dara): rendang made of burung punai or green pigeon.
 Rendang puyuh: rendang made of burung puyuh or quail bird.
 Rendang rawit: an extra hot and spicy dried rendang spices mixed with dried cabai rawit (bird's eye chili). Not exactly a dish, but more a condiment akin to serundeng, bawang goreng or chili powder that sprinkled upon steamed rice or noodle. 
 Rendang rebung: rendang made of bamboo shoot.
 Rendang runtiah (rendang suir): (lit: "shredded rendang") shredded beef or poultry rendang, speciality of Payakumbuh.
 Rendang sapuluik itam (rendang pulut hitam): dough made of ground black sticky rice cooked and served in rendang spice, specialty of Simalanggang.
 Rendang selais: rendang made of selais (Kryptopterus) fish, a genus of catfish found in rivers of Sumatra, popular in Pekanbaru, Riau.
 Rendang tahu: tofu rendang, a vegetarian variant that uses tofu beancurd instead of meat.
 Rendang talua (rendang telur): egg rendang, speciality of Payakumbuh.
 Rendang tempe: tempe rendang, a vegetarian variant that uses tempeh soybean cake instead of meat.
 Rendang teri: anchovy rendang.
 Rendang tongkol: mackerel tuna rendang, speciality of coastal Minangkabau regions.
 Rendang tuna: tuna rendang.
 Rendang tunjang (rendang kikil): rendang made of cartilage and tendons of cow's trotters.
 Rendang ubi: made of ubi kayu or singkong (cassava).
 Rendang udang: shrimp rendang.
 Rendang usus: intestine rendang, made of offals; the intestines of either poultry or cattle. The cattle intestine rendang is quite similar with gulai tambusu, gulai iso or gulai usus.

Today, rendang is quite widespread in Indonesia, owned mainly by the proliferation of Padang restaurants in the country, which led to popularity and adoption of rendang
into the kitchens of contemporary Indonesian households of various ethnic backgrounds. This might led to development of variants with slightly altered tastes to accommodate regional preferences. Other ethnic groups in Indonesia also have adopted a version of rendang into their daily diet. For example, in Java, the rendang—aside from the Padang variety sold in Padang restaurants—tend to be wet, slightly sweeter and less spicy to accommodate Javanese tastes.

Rendang outside Indonesia
Outside of Indonesia, rendang is also known in Malaysia, Singapore, Brunei, southern Thailand, and the southern Philippines as well as in the Netherlands, Australia and Belgium.

In Malaysia
Rendang has a long history in Malaysia with distinct versions unique to individual Malaysian states. The different versions of rendang use different ingredients for the spice mix, resulting in differing flavors to the meat.

 Rendang ayam: chicken rendang.
 Rendang ayam goreng: fried chicken rendang. The popularity of this rendang skyrocketed mainly due to rendangate controversy in 2018.
 Rendang daging or Rendang Rembau: dark, woody coloured meat rendang. Traditionally made using water buffalo meat. These days, beef is commonly used instead.
 Rendang daging hitam: Kicap Manis based black coloured beef rendang, a specialty of Sarawak.
 Rendang dendeng: thinly sliced dried meat rendang.
 Rendang ikan: fish rendang.
 Rendang ikan pari: stingray rendang, a specialty of Perak.
 Rendang itik: duck rendang, a specialty of Negeri Sembilan and Sarawak. In Sarawak, the duck will be roasted first so that the meat is soft and not sticky. In Negeri Sembilan, the duck is preferred to be smoked first.
 Rendang puyuh: quail rendang.
 Rendang kupang: mussles rendang.
 Rendang rusa: venison rendang.
 Rendang udang: prawn rendang, a specialty of Perak.
 Rendang kambing: goat rendang.
 Rendang kerang: cockles rendang. Commonly served as a side dish for Nasi Lemak.
 Rendang ketam: crab rendang.
 Rendang kijing: kijing, a type of shellfish cooked with rendang spices.
 Rendang hati: beef liver rendang, a specialty of Johor.
 Rendang telur: boiled egg rendang.
 Rendang kunyit or Rendang Kuala Pilah or Rendang kuning: yellow-hued rendang, uses fresh turmeric, lemongrass, and coconut milk but with no onion added at all.
 Rendang landak: porcupine rendang, an exotic meat rendang, a specialty of Sekinchan, Selangor.
 Rendang babi: pork rendang. Non-halal rendang that is eaten only by the Chinese and Peranakan community in Malaysia.
 Rendang lengkuas or Nasu Likku: galangal based rendang, a specialty of bugis people in Sabah. Two versions exist in Sabah, wet and dry, both are considered as rendang in Malaysia.
 Rendang lokan: lokan rendang, a specialty of Sungai Petani, Kedah.
 Rendang berempah: spice rendang. Emphasizes on the abundance of spices in the rendang.
 Rendang paru: beef lung rendang.
 Rendang daun maman: vegetable rendang made from maman leaf, specialty of Gemencheh, Negeri Sembilan.
 Rendang daun pegaga: vegetable rendang made from pegaga leaf.
 Rendang daun puding: vegetable rendang made from pudding leaf, a speciality of Negeri Sembilan.
 Rendang daun ubi kayu: vegetable rendang made from cassava leaf.
 Rendang jantung pisang: banana blossom rendang.
 Rendang serundeng: dry meat floss, derived from rendang. It has a long shelf-life and needs no refrigeration, a specialty of Kelantan.
 Rendang Minang: originated from the Minangkabau people who settled in Negeri Sembilan during the 16th century, but has since evolved from the Sumatran rendang version of the recipe.
 Rendang cili api or Rendang Negeri Sembilan or Rendang hijau: greenish-hued rendang, uses cili api instead of red chili that is normally used in other rendang versions, a specialty of Negeri Sembilan.
 Rendang Tok: dry beef rendang created by the royal cooks of Perak, incorporates spices that were typically inaccessible to the general population.
 Rendang Pahang or opor daging: dark red meat stew cooked with rich spice mix.
 Rendang Perak: simpler version of Rendang Tok, a specialty of Perak.
 Rendang Rawa: Rawa version of rendang, less complicated in terms of ingredients.
 Rendang Kedah: reddish-hued rendang, incorporates the use of red sugar, turmeric leaves, kaffir lime leaves due to the Thai influence on the state cuisine, a specialty of Kedah.
 Rendang Kelantan/Terengganu or kerutub daging: slow-cooked meat mixed with a unique spice known as kerutub, coconut milk, kerisik and some palm sugar.
 Rendang Nyonya: Peranakan version of rendang, a specialty of Peranakan.
 Rendang Sabah: uses white cumin to replace cinnamon and cloves, a specialty of Sabah.
 Rendang Sarawak: incorporates the use of turmeric leaves, a specialty of Sarawak.
 Rendang Siam: Malay-Siamese version of rendang, incorporates the use of Thai inspired ingredients.

In the Netherlands
The Dutch are familiar with rendang through colonial ties and often serve the wet kalio version in the Netherlands—usually as part of a rijsttafel. Indonesian dishes, including rendang, are served in numbers of Indonesian restaurants in Dutch cities, especially The Hague, Utrecht, Rotterdam and Amsterdam.

In the Philippines
In the Philippines, rendang is most commonly associated with the cuisine of the Muslim Maranao people of Mindanao. It differs from the Indonesian versions in the use of the native spice mix palapa as well as the addition of muscovado sugar.

Fusion rendang

Rendang bumbu is sometimes used as the base of other fusion dishes. Some chefs in Indonesian sushi establishments for example, have developed a Japanese-Indonesian fusion cuisine with recipes for krakatau roll, gado-gado roll, rendang roll and gulai ramen. Several chefs and food industries have experimented with fusing rendang with sandwiches, burgers and spaghetti. Burger King at one time served their take on a rendang-flavoured burger in their Singapore and Indonesia chains for a limited promotion period. Spaghetti with rendang could also be found in 7-Eleven convenience stores across Indonesia.

Rendang is also a popular flavour in Indonesian instant noodle variants, such as the Indomie Goreng Rendang''.

See also

 
 Cuisine of Indonesia
 Minangkabau cuisine
 Kalio, Indonesian dish
 Massaman curry, Thai dish with similar placing on "most delicious" list
 Kaeng hang le

References

External links
 
 BBC: Beef Rendang recipe
 CNN Indonesia Documentary of Rendang (in Indonesian)
 Indonesia Eats: Beef Rendang Recipe (Rendang Daging Minang)
 SBS: Indonesian Beef Rendang
 SBS: Malaysian Food Safari's Beef Rendang recipe

Padang cuisine
Bruneian cuisine
Malaysian cuisine
Philippine cuisine
Singaporean cuisine
Beef dishes
Indonesian chicken dishes
Foods containing coconut
Cocossian cuisine
Indonesian beef dishes